
Gmina Suchowola is an urban-rural gmina (administrative district) in Sokółka County, Podlaskie Voivodeship, in north-eastern Poland.

Villages
Apart from the town of Suchowola, Gmina Suchowola contains the villages and settlements of Bachmackie Kolonie, Brukowo, Chlewisk Dolny, Chlewisk Górny, Chmielniki, Chmielówka, Chodorówka Nowa, Chodorówka Stara, Chodorówka Stara-Kolonia, Ciemne, Czerwonka, Domuraty, Dryga, Dryga-Kolonia, Dubasiewskie Kolonie, Dubasiewszczyzna, Głęboczyzna, Grodzisk, Grymiaczki, Hołodolina, Horodnianka, Jatwieź Duża, Jatwieź Mała, Karpowicze, Kiersnówka, Kopciówka, Krzywa, Laudańszczyzna, Leśniki, Leszczany, Morgi, Nowe Stojło, Okopy, Olszanka, Ostrówek, Piątak, Podgrodzisk, Podhorodnianka, Podostrówek, Pokośno, Połomin, Połomin-Kolonia, Poświętne, Rutkowszczyzna, Sucha Góra, Tablewo, Trzyrzecze, Wólka, Żakle and Zgierszczańskie.

Neighbouring gminas
Gmina Suchowola is bordered by the gminas of Dąbrowa Białostocka, Janów, Jaświły, Korycin and Sztabin.

External links
Polish official population figures 2006

Suchowola
Sokółka County